The Orono Dam is a hydroelectric dam on the Stillwater River at its confluence with the Penobscot River in Orono, Penobscot County, Maine. As a part of the Penobscot River restoration and the removal of the Great Works and Veazie dams, the Orono Dam and Stillwater Dam will be upgraded to maintain previous levels of power generation.

References

Dams in Maine
Penobscot River
Buildings and structures in Orono, Maine
Buildings and structures in Penobscot County, Maine
Dams completed in 1960